The Numurkah Football Club, nicknamed the Blues, is an Australian rules football and netball club based in the town of Numurkah located in north east Victoria.

The club teams currently competes in the Murray FNL, which Numurkah (established in 1882) was a founding member in 1931.

Football Premierships
Seniors
 Goulburn Valley Football Association (8)
 1888, 1889, 1890, 1920, 1922, 1924, 1925, 1926 
 Murray Football League (13):
 1932, 1933, 1937, 1938, 1950, 1951, 1953, 1962, 1970, 1977, 1979, 1999, 2000

Reserves
?

M. D. O'Dwyer Medallists (Murray FL – League Best & Fairest) 

 1934 – George Bourke (Joint Winner)
 1935 – George Bourke
 1938 – George Bourke
 1939 – George Bourke. (In 1946, George Bourke won the Lismore Football League best & fairest award too) 
 1946 – Merv Dudley (Joint Winner)
 1949 – Syd Stewart
 1950 – Syd Stewart
 1952 – V.T. Davies
 1970 – Peter Dealy (23 votes)
 1981 – G. Ralph (18 votes)

Les Mogg Perpetual Trophy Winners (Leading Goalkicker) 

 1965 – Darryl Twitt (82 goals)
 1966 – Darryl Twitt (93 goals)
 1967 – Darryl Twitt (71 goals)
 1968 – Darryl Twitt (62 goals)
 1977 – D. Rudd (55 goals)
 1994 – Perry Meka  (102 goals)
 1995 – Perry Meka (95 goals)

Numurkah FC players who played in the VFL
The following players played with Numurkah, prior to playing senior football in the VFL, with the year indicating their VFL debut.
 1904 – Bill Payne – Carlton
 1905 – Dave McNamara – St. Kilda
 1906 – Alf George – Essendon & Melbourne
 1909 – Joe Richie – St. Kilda
 1909 – Duncan McIvor – Collingwood
 1921 – Eddie Hanley – Richmond
 1923 – Bob McCaskill – Richmond
 1932 – Jock Fahey – South Melbourne
 1940 – Merv Dudley – South Melbourne
 1967 – Reg Sanders – North Melbourne
 1981 – Phillip Harrison – Geelong
 1984 – David Simpson – Geelong

AFL drafted players 

 1990 – Adam Rudd (1990 National Draft – # 91) St Kilda – 0 games
 1997 – Mark Brown (1997 Rookie Draft – # 10) Sydney – 0 games

References

External links
 Facebook page
 Twitter page

Murray Football League clubs
Netball teams in Victoria (Australia)
Australian rules football clubs in Victoria (Australia)